In the 1953 Wimbledon Championships – Gentlemen's Singles, second seed Vic Seixas defeated the unseeded Kurt Nielsen in the final, 9–7, 6–3, 6–4, to take the gentlemen's singles tennis title. Frank Sedgman was the defending champion, but was ineligible to compete after turning professional.

Progress of the competition
It was the first of two Men's Singles competitions at Wimbledon in which an unseeded Nielsen had progressed to the final. On the way, he defeated both the number one seed Ken Rosewall and a favourite with the Wimbledon crowd, fourth-seeded Jaroslav Drobný, the latter in straight sets.

Drobný's earlier third-round match against Budge Patty, came to be regarded as a classic in Wimbledon history. The match lasted for 93 games, and held the Wimbledon record for the longest match until 1969.

Seeds

  Ken Rosewall (quarterfinals)
  Vic Seixas (champion)
  Mervyn Rose (semifinals)
  Jaroslav Drobný (semifinals)
  Gardnar Mulloy (fourth round)
  Lew Hoad (quarterfinals)
  Art Larsen (quarterfinals)
  Enrique Morea (second round)

Draw

Finals

Top half

Section 1

Section 2

Section 3

Section 4

Bottom half

Section 5

Section 6

Section 7

Section 8

References

External links

Men's Singles
Wimbledon Championship by year – Men's singles